Mogimont Airport  was a public use airport located near Bouillon, Luxembourg, Wallonia, Belgium. It was used only for ultralights, before it closed circa 2009.

See also
List of airports in Belgium

References 

Airports in Luxembourg (Belgium)
Bouillon
Defunct airports in Belgium